MFC 24: HeatXC was a mixed martial arts event to be held by the Maximum Fighting Championship (MFC) on February 26, 2010 at the River Cree Resort and Casino in Enoch, Alberta. The main event featured Yves Edwards taking on Derrick Noble in a lightweight bout. The event aired live on HDNet.

Results

References

See also
 Maximum Fighting Championship
 List of Maximum Fighting Championship events
 2010 in Maximum Fighting Championship

24
2010 in mixed martial arts
Mixed martial arts in Canada
Sport in Alberta
2010 in Canadian sports